Baranivka is the name of several populated places (including at least eight villages) in Ukraine:

Baranivka (city), in Zhytomyr Oblast
Baranivka, Myrhorod Raion, Poltava Oblast, a village
Baranivka, Ternopil Oblast, a village

See also
 Baranovka (disambiguation)